Karolina Halatek (born 1985) is a Polish contemporary visual artist working in a field of installation art, using light as a key medium. Karolina Halatek creates experiential site-specific spaces that incorporate visual, architectural and sculptural elements. Seeing her work primarily as a catalyst for experience, Karolina creates installations that have strong experiential and immersive characteristics, often the result of collaborations with quantum physicists, founders of the superstring theory (Leonard Susskind, Roger Penrose, Carlo Rovelii) and precision mechanical engineers.

Career
Halatek studied Design for Performance at the University of the Arts London, Wimbledon College of Art, Great Britain, Fine Arts at the Universität der Künste Berlin, Germany and Media Art at the Academy of Fine Arts in Warsaw, Poland. During studies in Berlin, she participated in workshops at the Institut für Raumexperimente run by Olafur Eliasson. Karolina Halatek received the Minister's Scholarship for Fine Arts from the Minister of Culture and National Heritage in Poland, a London residency managed by Acme Studios International Residencies Programme in collaboration with Adam Mickiewicz Institute in Warsaw in 2014, artist residency at CEC Artslink NYC and Laumeier Sculpture Park, St. Louis, Missouri; residency at a$ Art Museum in Chengdu, China. Karolina Halatek was a fellow through the »New Networks« project, a cooperation of Akademie Schloss Solitude and the Center for Contemporary Art Ujazdowski Castle in Warsaw, with financial support by the Adam Mickiewicz Institute in Warsaw. In cooperation with KulturRegion Stuttgart and the city of Gerlingen, Karolina Halatek participated in the Lichkunstfestival »Aufstiege« of KulturRegion Stuttgart during her stay at Akademie Schloss Solitude. In 2015 her Scanner Room Video was broadcast into outer space at the MONA FOMA Festival held by the Museum of Old and New Art in Hobart, Tasmania.

Near Death Experience in Contemporary Art  
Karolina Halatek dedicated one of her projects to the subject of Near Death Experience (NDE). Terminal  her immersive light installation was inspired by the testimonies of people who returned from unconsciousness, reported their experiences at the threshold of death. Installation has been exhibited multiple times in Gerlingen/Stuttgart and in front of Kunsthalle Bremen, Germany. In 2018 project has been presented at the 4th International Time Perspective Conference, University of Nantes, France.

Major Exhibitions 
 Germany: Kunstahalle Bremen, Aufstiege Lichtkunstfestival by KulturRegion Stuttgart, Akademie Schloss Solitude,                                                                                         Kunstkraftwerk Leipzig, Design Transfer Gallery Berlin, Universität der Künste Berlin
 Laumeier Sculpture Park, St. Louis, USA
 Kinetica Art Fair, London, Great Britain
 Transmission Festival, Omonoia Athens Biennial, Greece
Edinburgh Fringe Festival, Scotland
 Dubai ECHO Festival of Art, Design and Technology, United Arab Emirates 
 A4 Art Museum, Chengdu, China 
 Morcote Public Art Biennial, Galleria Daniele Agostini, Lugano, Switzerland
 De School during Amsterdam Dance Event, curated by Children of the Light, Netherlands 
 4th International Time Perspective Conference at University of Nantes, France
 Poland: Centre for Contemporary Art Ujazdowski Castle in Warsaw, Centre for Contemporary Art Elektrownia in Radom, Galeria Labirynt in Lublin, Museum of Lublin, BWA Galleries of Contemporary Art Wrocław, Museum of Archeology and Ethnography in Łódź, Lodz Design, Manhattan Gallery in Łódź, Galeria Opus in Łódź, Fotofestiwal International Festival of Photography in Łódź, Otwarta Pracownia, Kraków, Salon Akademii Gallery in Warsaw, Propaganda Gallery  at Warsaw Gallery Weekend.

Public Presentations / Artist Talks 
 Artslink Assembly, Columbia University School of the Arts, 2018
 Laumeier Sculpture Park, St.Louis, USA, 2018
 Webster University, Department of Art, Design & Art History, St.Louis, USA, 2018
 4th International Time Perspective Conference, University of Nantes, France, 2018
 Kunsthalle Bremen, Long Night of the Museums, 2018 
 Light as a Creative Tool Conference, Academy of Fine Arts in Gdańsk, Poland, 2018
 Kunstkrafwerk Leipzg, Germany, 2017
 ÜberLicht, Art in Public Spaces, Esslingen, during Ascents Light Art Festival, Germany, 2016
 Gerlingen City Council, Germany, 2016
Near Death Experience Conference, Gerlingen, Germany, 2016
 Symposium on Abstract Geometry, Radziejowice, Poland, 2015
 The Educational Film Studio (WFO) Łódź, Poland, 2013
 Academy of Fine Arts Łódź, Poland, 2013

Press 
 Terminal  Artdaily, Designboom, iGnant, Archdaily, Culture.pl, Welt, Jurnal du Design, Illumni, Urdesign, Skai, Goood
 Scanner Room Artdaily, Creators Project, FAD Magazine, Pylon Hub, Illumni, Starry Night
 Cloud Square FAD Magazine, Designboom, Illumni

Bibliography 
 Forma i Nieprzedstawialne - Radziejowice 2015 
 Sztuka a wartości Ponadczasowe - Radziejowice 2016 
 Światło w geomertii - Radziejowice 2017, 
 Mere Formality, Galeria Labirynt, 
 Pankiewicz i Po... Uwalnianie koloru, Muzeum Lubelskie 
Change, Łódź Art Center, Poland 
Czarny Neseser, BWA Wrocław Galleries of Contemporary Art 
ABS, Salon Akademii Gallery, Academy of Fine Arts in Warsaw 
Dairy 2017, Centre for Contemporary Art Ujazdowski Castle, Warsaw

References

External links 
 Karolina Halatek's website 
 Karolina Halatek on Culture.pl
 Karolina Halatek on Digital Cultures

1985 births
Living people
Polish women artists